Cerzeto is an Arbëreshë town and comune in the province of Cosenza in the Calabria region of southern Italy.

People
Karmel Kandreva, writer and poet

References

Arbëresh settlements
Cities and towns in Calabria